Nordhoff is a planned light rail station on the Los Angeles County Metro Rail system. The station is part of the East San Fernando Light Rail Project and planned to open in 2028. It is located on Van Nuys Boulevard at the intersection with Nordhoff Street in the Panorama neighborhood of Los Angeles. The station features a single island platform in the median strip on the north leg of Van Nuys.

References

Future Los Angeles Metro Rail stations
Railway stations scheduled to open in 2028
Panorama City, Los Angeles